Rudolf Bauer may refer to:
Rudolf Bauer (artist) (1889–1953), German-born painter
Rudolf Bauer (athlete) (1879–1932), Hungarian athlete
Rudolf Bauer (politician) (born 1957), first President of the Košice Self-governing Region